Madhu Dandavate (21 January 1924 – 12 November 2005) was an Indian physicist and socialist politician, who served as Minister of Railways in the Morarji Desai ministry, and as Minister of Finance in the V P Singh ministry.

Born in Ahmednagar, Bombay Presidency, Dandavate studied and was employed as a physicist in Bombay, before participating in the Quit India Movement in 1942. After independence, he served as a Member of Parliament from Rajapur in Maharashtra from 1971 to 1991. As an opposition politician, Dandavate was jailed during the Emergency. Serving as Railway Minister from 1977 to 1979, he initiated a number of improvements, most notably providing more comfortable cushioned seats to second-class passengers, a measure that "helped hundreds of millions of people". Later in the late 1980s, he served as Finance Minister.

A prominent socialist politician and opposition leader, Dandavate was respected for his integrity, knowledge, simplicity and pragmatism, with historian Ramachandra Guha placing him among the few ministers who "shall be remembered for having carried out programmes that radically reshaped the lives of their people".

Early life and career
Madhu Dandavate was born in a Marathi Deshastha Brahmin family in Ahmednagar on January 21, 1924, the son of Ramachandra Dandavate. After completing his M.Sc. in Physics from Royal Institute of Science, Bombay, he headed the Physics department at Siddhartha College of Arts and Sciences, Bombay.

Political career
Dandavate entered politics as an independence activist, participating in the Quit India Movement in 1942. He was the leader of a Satyagraha campaign in Goa in 1955 against Portuguese imperialism.

He was a member of Praja Socialist Party, and since 1948 served as chairman of its Maharashtra unit. Later, he also served as the party's joint secretary. He was an active leader of the Land Liberation Movement, 1969.

During 1970–71, Dandavate was a member of the Maharashtra Legislative Council. From 1971 to 1990, he was a Member of Parliament, elected to the Lok Sabha for five consecutive terms from Rajapur in Konkan, Maharashtra. He was one of the prominent opposition leaders during Indira Gandhi and Rajiv Gandhi's tenures as Prime Ministers.

Dandavate was arrested during the Emergency in 1975, spending time in Bangalore Central Jail.

After the end of the Emergency and the 1977 elections, Dandavate served as the Minister of Railways in the Morarji Desai ministry. He initiated a number of improvements in the country's rail infrastructure. These included the computerization of railway reservations, which reduced corruption among booking clerks and uncertainty among passengers; sanctioning the first phase of the Konkan Railway in 1978–79, with a line from Apta to Roha; and the repair or replacement of 5000 kilometres of worn-out tracks. Most notably, he introduced cushioned berths for passengers of second-class sleeper coaches, replacing the existing wooden berths, to provide for a more comfortable journey. While initially implemented in the major trunk lines, all trains had these padded berths in their second-class compartments by the end of the 1980s.

As a parliamentarian, one of his major interventions during the enactment of the Anti-Defection Law in 1985 was the incorporation of a safety clause to allow dissent.

Dandavate later served as the Finance Minister in the cabinet of V. P. Singh. His parliamentary career ended after his loss to Major Sudhir Sawant of the Congress in 1991, and he slowly receded from national politics.

He was also the Deputy Chairman of the Planning Commission in 1990, and again from 1996 to 1998.

Death 
After a protracted period of suffering from cancer, Dandavate died at the Jaslok Hospital in Mumbai on 12 November 2005, at the age of 81. As per his wishes, his body was donated to the city's J. J. Hospital.

Personal life
Madhu Dandavate was married to Pramila Dandavate, who was also prominently involved in the socialist movement in India, in 1953. She was a member of the 7th Lok Sabha after being elected in the 1980 general election from the Mumbai North Central constituency. During their 18-month detention during the Emergency, with Madhu lodged in Bangalore Central Jail and Pramila in Yerawada Jail in Pune, the couple wrote each other 200 letters, discussing issues like music, books, philosophy and love.

Pramila died on 31 December 2001 after a heart attack. The couple had one son, Uday, who studied at the National Institute of Design, and owns a design research consulting company in San Francisco, US. In 2014, Uday Dandavate joined the Aam Aadmi Party.

Legacy 
A prominent socialist politician and opposition leader, Dandavate was known for his incisive speeches laced with wit and humour, often raising issues of public importance during Zero Hour in Parliament. He was also hailed for his integrity and humility.

In India After Gandhi, historian Ramachandra Guha highlights Dandavate's pragmatism, stating that "his socialism eschewed rhetoric against the rich in favour of policies for the poor. As he [Dandavate] put it, 'what I want to do is not degrade the first class but elevate the second class'." Noting his role in the introduction of cushioned seats in trains, Guha writes that "those two inches of foam" have probably "brought more succour to more people than any other initiative by an Indian politician". Guha thus places him among the few ministers who "shall be remembered for having carried out programmes that radically reshaped the lives of their people".

Bibliography
Dandavate authored a number of books. His speeches and lectures have also been published.
 Future of Parliamentary Democracy in India, Harold Laski Institute of Political Science, 1974 
 Marx and Gandhi, Popular Prakashan, 1977
 Jayaprakash Narayan, the Man and His Ideas, Popular Prakashan, Bombay 1981 
 Evolution of Socialist Policies and Perspective, 1934-1984, Popular Prakashan, 1986
 As the Mind Unfolds: Issues and Personalities, Shipra Publications, 1993, 
 Echoes in Parliament: Madhu Dandavate's speeches in Parliament, 1971-1990, Allied Publishers, 1995, 
 Quest of Conscience, Shipra Publications, 1998, 
 Yusuf Meherally: Quest For New Horizons, National Book Trust, India, 1998 
 Parivartanāce Pāīka: Mahātmā Jotibā Phule Aani Nyāyamūrtī Rānaḍe, Sadhana Prakashan, 2001 
 Jayaprakash Narayan: Struggle with Values: A Centenary Tribute, Allied Publishers, 2002, 
 Dialogue with Life, Allied Publishers, 2005 
 Social Roots of Gender Injustice, Theosophical Publishing House, 2005

References

Further reading
 Madhu Dandavate: , The Hindu, 6 Jan. 2002.
 Madhu Dandavate: `Vote-on-account: use and misuse', The Hindu, 4 Feb. 2004.
 Madhu Dandavate: , The Hindu, 6 Apr. 2005.

1924 births
2005 deaths
Indian socialists
Gandhians
Marathi politicians
Lok Sabha members from Maharashtra
Desai administration
Railway Ministers of India
Finance Ministers of India
Ministers for Corporate Affairs
V. P. Singh administration
India MPs 1971–1977
India MPs 1977–1979
India MPs 1980–1984
India MPs 1984–1989
India MPs 1989–1991
Members of the Maharashtra Legislative Council
Indians imprisoned during the Emergency (India)
Janata Dal politicians
Praja Socialist Party politicians
Janata Party politicians
Janata Dal (Secular) politicians
Indian independence activists from Maharashtra
Prisoners and detainees of British India
20th-century Indian physicists
English-language writers from India
Marathi-language writers
Scientists from Maharashtra